Squarestem is a common name for several plants and may refer to:

Chrysothemis pulchella
Melanthera